Blake Hunter (born January 17, 1934) is an American television producer and writer. He is best known as the co-creator of the sitcom Who's the Boss?, which aired on ABC from 1984 until 1992 and which co-starred Tony Danza and Judith Light, in 1984 with business partner Martin "Marty" Cohan.

Hunter also worked as creative consultant on The Upper Hand, the British version of Who's the Boss? which debuted in 1990 and aired for seven seasons on the ITV network in the United Kingdom.

References

External links

American television writers
American male television writers
American television producers
Living people
Place of birth missing (living people)
1936 births